Adok is a port on the White Nile in Southern Liech State, South Sudan.
In the early 1980s Chevron Corporation found oil in Adok.

Adok had strategic value during the Second Sudanese Civil War (1983-2005).
Between October and December 1991 the town was the scene of fighting between the Nasir and Torit factions of the Sudan People's Liberation Army (SPLA).
In the late 1990s the Austrian company OMV began explorations in the Leer-Adok area.
Between December 2002 and early February 2003 the government made a renewed push to clear the road south from Bentiu to the port of Adok.

References

Sources

Populated places in Jonglei State